U46, U 46 or U-46 may refer to:

 German submarine U-46, one of several German submarines
 U 46, a runic inscription on one of the Lovö Runestones
 U-46, a short name for Elgin Area School District U46, a school district in Elgin, Illinois